Henry Warner may refer to:

Henry F. Warner (1923–1944), U.S. Army soldier and Medal of Honor recipient
Henry Warner (English cricketer), English cricketer
Henry Warner (Trinidadian cricketer) (1854-1929), Trinidadian cricketer
Henry Lee Warner (1688–1760), English landowner and politician
Henry M. Warner (1809–1875), member of the Wisconsin State Assembly
Henry Warner (MP) (c.1551–1617), MP for Suffolk (1597) and Thetford (1601) Parliament constituencies
H. B. Warner (1876–1958), English film and theatre actor

See also

Harry Warner (disambiguation)